This is a list of colleges and universities in Arizona. This list also includes other educational institutions providing higher education, meaning tertiary, quaternary, and, in some cases, post-secondary education.

Active institutions

Two-year institutions
Arizona Western College, Yuma, San Luis, Quartzsite, Wellton, Somerton
Central Arizona College, Coolidge, Casa Grande, Florence, Maricopa, Winkelman, Apache Junction, Queen Creek
Cochise College, Douglas, Sierra Vista, Benson, Willcox, Fort Huachuca, Nogales
Coconino Community College, Flagstaff, Williams, Page
Eastern Arizona College, Thatcher
Maricopa County Community College District
Chandler-Gilbert Community College, Chandler, Mesa, Sun Lakes
Estrella Mountain Community College, Avondale
GateWay Community College, Phoenix
Glendale Community College, Glendale
Mesa Community College, Mesa
Paradise Valley Community College, Phoenix
Phoenix College, Phoenix
Rio Salado Community College, distance learning community college, Tempe
Scottsdale Community College, Scottsdale
South Mountain Community College, Phoenix
Mohave Community College, Kingman, Bullhead City, Lake Havasu City
Northland Pioneer College, Snowflake, Show Low, Holbrook, Winslow
Pima Community College, Tucson
Yavapai College, Prescott, Sedona, Clarkdale, Chino Valley

Tribal institutions
Navajo Nation
Diné College, Tsaile
Tohono O'odham Nation
Tohono O'odham Community College, Sells

Defunct institutions

See also

 List of college athletic programs in Arizona
Arizona Board of Regents
Higher education in the United States
List of American institutions of higher education
List of recognized higher education accreditation organizations
List of colleges and universities
List of colleges and universities by country

References

External links
Department of Education listing of accredited institutions in Arizona
U.S. Department of Education: College Scorecard, listing of accredited institutions in Arizona

 
Arizona, List of colleges and universities in
Colleges and universities